The discography for the Puerto Rican singer Ednita Nazario

Discography

Album charts

Singles

Chart accomplishments

See also
 Ednita Nazario

Discographies of Puerto Rican artists
Latin pop music discographies